The Redwood Transit System is a commuter transit service that operates Monday-Saturday on the Highway 101 corridor between Trinidad and Garberville in Humboldt County, California, and also serves Westhaven, McKinleyville, Arcata, Eureka, Fields Landing, Loleta, Fortuna, and Scotia. The RTS Willow Creek Extension operates between Arcata and Willow Creek during weekday commute hours.

Additionally, Redwood Transit System is administered by Humboldt Transit Authority.

Fleet 

RTS operates a fleet of suburban buses with high-back seating. Mainline service between Trinidad and Scotia is operated with Gillig Phantoms and hybrid Low Floors, while service to Willow Creek and Garberville is operated with cutaway commuter buses.

External links 
 Redwood Transit System
 HTA Media: Audio and Visual Recordings of Humboldt Transit Authority buses

Bus transportation in California
Public transportation in Humboldt County, California